Viro is a village in Setomaa Parish, Võru County in Estonia.

According to the 2011 census, the village had 3 inhabitants, all Estonians. 

In 2020, the village was 0.3km2(0.1m2)

History 

The Estonian tsässon visited the village . In this respect, the limestone is marked by the Estonian stone cross , which was probably erected in the 15th century.

In 2000, there were 4 inhabitants.

Before the administrative reform of Estonian local governments in 2017, the village belonged to Meremäe Parish .

References

Villages in Võru County